Shirley Jaffe is a British actress. She trained at the Central School of Speech and Drama, before embarking on a career on stage and screen, most famously appearing in Stanley Kubrick's A Clockwork Orange. After a lengthy break raising a family, she returned to professional acting in 2002.

Career
Shirley Jaffe trained at the Central School of Speech & Drama in 1954, and among other jobs was in the first British Theatre in the Round Company at Scarborough with Stephen Joseph and later Alan Ayckbourn, and in the last year of long running TV serial Emergency Ward 10 as Nurse Angela Foster.

Her film career began in 1970 as a maid in Peter Sasdy's Taste the Blood of Dracula. In 1971 she made a brief appearance in Stanley Kubrick's film A Clockwork Orange: some sources erroneously identify her as the victim of Billy Boy's gang, but in fact she played a nurse who helps administer the first round of Ludovico's treatment to Alex (Malcolm McDowell). Skybreak, the home she then shared with her husband Tony, was also featured in the film, as the interior location for the scene in which Alex's gang attack a writer and his wife (played by Patrick Magee and Adrienne Corri) in A Clockwork Orange was Shirley's last film appearance for close to 35 years.

Jaffe appeared on television in Michael Jackson's Earth Song music video, and as a Greek nun in Little Britain Abroad. She directed and acted in plays in Brighton, Edinburgh, The West End and Helsinki festivals and most recently played Irene in award-winning British feature Ambleton Delight. She was nominated for a Star award in the Brighton Fringe for her performance as "Nana" in the new musical, Here Comes the Bride.

Filmography

References

External links

Star Now bio
Shirley Jaffe as Chris' grandmother, Irene Phillips in Ambleton Delight

English film actresses
Living people
English stage actresses
Year of birth missing (living people)